Nawab Ali Yavar Jung Bahadur (February 1906 – 11 December 1976) was an Indian diplomat. He served as Indian Ambassador in Argentina, Egypt, Yugoslavia and Greece, France, and the United States.

He was governor of the Indian state of Maharashtra from 1971 to 1976. He was awarded the Padma Bhushan and the Padma Vibhushan, India's highest civilian honors, in 1959 and 1977, respectively.

Early life
He was born in Hyderabad to a distinguished Hyderabadi family of scholars, administrators and educators, and studied at Queen's College, Oxford, earning a degree in History.

Career
Nawab Ali Yavar Jung served as the Vice-chancellor of Osmania University from 1945 to 1946 and from 1948 to 1952. In year 1965 to 1968 he was Vice-Chancellor of Aligarh Muslim University. He opposed reservation on religious grounds at AMU. In 1946-47 he was Minister Constitutional Affairs, Home and Educational, Public Health and Local Government in the Nizam's Governorate. He resigned from that post in 1947.

He was India's ambassador to Argentina (1952–54), Egypt (1954–58), Yugoslavia and Greece (1958–61), France (1961–65), and the United States (1968–70). His personal rapport with Juan Perón, Gamal Abdel Nasser, Josip Broz Tito, Charles de Gaulle, and Lyndon B. Johnson substantially contributed to their understanding and appreciation of India's independent foreign policy.

He was appointed governor of Maharashtra in 1971, and died during his term as governor at Mumbai's Raj Bhavan in December 1976.

He was awarded the Padma Bhushan and the Padma Vibhushan, India's highest civilian honors, in 1959 and 1977, respectively. The Western Express Highway in Mumbai and The National Institute for the Hearing Handicapped located there are named after him.

Personal life 
He married a French lady Alys Iffrig, but the couple got divorced. His daughter with Iffrig was Bilkees I. Latif. Bilkees' husband, his son-in-law was the Air Chief Marshal Idris Hasan Latif, the 10th Chief of the Air Staff. Later, he married Zehra Ali Yavar Jung, a social worker.

See also 
 Zehra Ali Yavar Jung
 Syed Akbaruddin

References

1906 births
1976 deaths
Alumni of The Queen's College, Oxford
20th-century Indian Muslims
Recipients of the Padma Vibhushan in public affairs
Recipients of the Padma Bhushan in civil service
Governors of Maharashtra
Ambassadors of India to Argentina
Ambassadors of India to Egypt
Ambassadors of India to France
Ambassadors of India to Greece
Ambassadors of India to the United States
Ambassadors of India to Yugoslavia
People from Hyderabad State
Salar Jung family
Politicians from Hyderabad, India
Vice-Chancellors of the Aligarh Muslim University
20th-century Indian historians
Tyabji family